24 Pashons - Coptic calendar - 26 Pashons

Fixed commemorations

All fixed commemorations below are observed on 25 Pashons (2 June) by the Coptic Orthodox Church

Saints
 Saint Colluthus

Other Commemorations
 Ibrahim El-Gohary

References
Coptic Synexarion

Days of the Coptic calendar